Świrus (Czech: Dr. Šílenec) is a 1996 Polish adventure video game developed by Mirage and published by Vochozka Trading, who also translated the game into Czech. Some years after its original release the game was released as a free download.

Production 
Świrus is the first polish adventure game designed for Windows. The humour of the game derives from the culture of Polish life in the 1980s and 1990s.

Plot and gameplay 

Świrus is a classic point & click adventure game, viewed from a first person perspective. it includes the command verb-based SCUMM interface. It features a comic art style. The player takes control of a teenager named Phillip who is visited by a clone from the future with a warning that he is the only one who can save the world from a mad Polish doctor named Dr. Šílenec.

Critical reception 
In a nostalgic review of the game 18 years after its release Cnews.cz noted the game's sometimes crazy sense of logic.

References

External links 
 Review in Score magazine
 Review in Level magazine

1996 video games
Adventure games
Single-player video games
Video games developed in Poland
Vochozka Trading games
Windows games
Windows-only games